Full Bloom is a live album by Acoustic Strawbs.

Track listing

"Autumn"
"Heroine's Theme" (John Hawken)
"Deep Summer Sleep" (Dave Cousins)
"The Winter Long" (Cousins)
"Shine on Silver Sun" (Cousins)
"Ghosts" (Cousins)
"Sweet Dreams"
"Night Light"
"Guardian Angel"
"Night Light"
"The Flower and the Young Man" (Cousins)
"Remembering" (Hawken)
"You and I (When We Were Young)" (Cousins)
"The Winter and the Summer" (Dave Lambert)
"Tears and Pavan" (Cousins, Richard Hudson, John Ford)
"Out in the Cold" (Cousins)
"Round and Round" (Cousins)
"Alice's Song" (Cathryn Craig, Brian Willoughby)
"Hero and Heroine" (Cousins)
"A Glimpse of Heaven" (Cousins)
"The River" (Cousins)
"Down by the Sea" (Cousins)

Personnel

Dave Cousins – lead vocals, backing vocals, acoustic guitar, mandolin, banjo
Dave Lambert – lead vocals, backing vocals, acoustic guitar
Brian Willoughby – acoustic guitar
Jon Connolly - producer and director

Recording

Recorded live by Jon Connolly at Natural Sound, Kitchener, Ontario, Canada

Release history

References
Full Bloom on Strawbsweb

2004 live albums
Strawbs live albums